The Operation of the Sonne is an album by The Dead C, released in 1994 by Siltbreeze.

Track listing

Personnel 
Adapted from The Operation of the Sonne liner notes.

The Dead C
Michael Morley – instruments
Bruce Russell – instruments
Robbie Yeats – instruments

Production and additional personnel
 The Dead C – production
 Brent Willis – label drawing

Release history

References

External links 
 The Operation of the Sonne at Discogs (list of releases)

1994 EPs
The Dead C albums